The 2018 MFF Cup is the 11th edition of the MFF Cup, the knockout football tournament in Mongolia.

First round
Results:

Second round
The draw was held on 31 May 2018.

Results:

Third round
The draw was held on 25 June 2018.

Results:

Quarter-finals
The draw was held on 31 July 2018.

Results:

Semi-finals
Results:

Final

Bracket

See also
2018 Mongolian Premier League

References

External links
Mongolian Football Federation Facebook page

Football competitions in Mongolia
Mongolia
Cup